The de Bruijn–Newman constant, denoted by Λ and named after Nicolaas Govert de Bruijn and Charles Michael Newman, is a mathematical constant defined via the zeros of a certain function H(λ,z), where λ is a real parameter and z is a complex variable.  More precisely,
,
where  is the super-exponentially decaying function

and Λ is the unique real number with the property that H has only real zeros if and only if λ≥Λ, it was later found to be actually λ>Λ.

The constant is closely connected with Riemann's hypothesis concerning the zeros of the Riemann zeta-function: since the Riemann hypothesis is equivalent to the claim that all the zeroes of H(0, z) are real, the Riemann hypothesis is equivalent to the conjecture that Λ≤0. Brad Rodgers and Terence Tao proved that Λ<0 cannot be true, so Riemann's hypothesis is equivalent to Λ = 0.  A simplified proof of the Rodgers–Tao result was later given by Alexander Dobner.

History 
De Bruijn showed in 1950 that H has only real zeros if λ ≥ 1/2, and moreover, that if H has only real zeros for some λ, H also has only real zeros if λ is replaced by any larger value. Newman proved in 1976 the existence of a constant Λ for which the "if and only if" claim holds; and this then implies that Λ is unique. Newman also conjectured that Λ ≥ 0, which was then proven by Brad Rodgers and Terence Tao in 2018.

Upper bounds 

A manuscript of the Polymath work was submitted to arXiv in late April 2019, and was published in the journal Research In the Mathematical Sciences in August 2019.

Historical bounds

References

External links
 

Mathematical constants
Analytic number theory